In molecular biology, intercellular adhesion molecules (ICAMs) and vascular cell adhesion molecule-1 (VCAM-1) are part of the immunoglobulin superfamily. They are important in inflammation, immune responses and in intracellular signalling events. The ICAM family consists of five members, designated ICAM-1 to ICAM-5. They are known to bind to leucocyte integrins CD11/CD18 such as LFA-1 and Macrophage-1 antigen, during inflammation and in immune responses. In addition, ICAMs may exist in soluble forms in human plasma, due to activation and proteolysis mechanisms at cell surfaces.

Mammalian intercellular adhesion molecules include:
 ICAM-1
 ICAM2
 ICAM3
 ICAM4
 ICAM5

References

Cell biology
Protein families